Nessariostoma granulosum is a lightly armored pseudopetalichthyid placoderm from the Hunsrückschiefer Lagerstätte of Early Devonian Germany.  The type and only known specimen is an articulated, but very incomplete individual, deformed and elongated, consisting of a large, incomplete, tubercle-covered head, a long, beak-like rostrum, and some of the trunk, with a total length of 18 centimeters.<ref name=Denison>{{cite book|last=Denison|first=Robert|title=Placodermi Volume 2 of Handbook of Paleoichthyology'''|year=1978|publisher=Gustav Fischer Verlag|location=Stuttgart New York|isbn=978-0-89574-027-4|pages=119–120}}</ref>  N. granulosum was once placed in Stensioellida, though most other experts regard it at as a pseudopetalichthyid: Denison 1978 regards it as a placoderm incertae sedis'' because the specimen is deformed and so poorly preserved so as to stymie proper attempts at classification.

References

External links
 Pseudopetalichthys at the Paleobiology Database

Pseudopetalichthyida
Fossils of Germany